METRORail is a light rail transit system serving Houston, Texas. The system is operated by the Metropolitan Transit Authority of Harris County, also known as METRO. METRORail carries 60,600 passengers a day, making it one of the largest light rail systems in the United States in terms of ridership.

METRORail began service on January 1, 2004, with 16 stations from Fannin South station to UH–Downtown station. The line was extended north to Northline Transit Center with 8 new stations on December 21, 2013, as part of the North/Red Line Extension. 13 stations were added on May 23, 2015, with the opening of the Green and Purple lines. The two lines intersect with the Red Line at the new Central Station, which had partially opened on February 18, 2015 for Red Line trains. Two additional stations on the Green Line were opened on January 11, 2017, extending the line to the Magnolia Park Transit Center. METRO has also proposed to add 26 more stations on the University and Uptown lines in western Houston.

Only two METRORail stations have public park and rides, Burnett Transit Center and Fannin South; both lots charge a daily rate of $3.

Stations

Planned and proposed stations

In addition to the 26 stations listed below, three existing stations will be made into transfer stations with the University Line: Wheeler station on the Red Line, and the Robertson Stadium/UH/TSU and Elgin/Third Ward on the Purple Line.

References

Stations

Houston
METRORail
METRORail stations